The Lakshmi Barrage, also known as the Medigadda Barrage is the starting point of the proposed Kaleshwaram Project which envisages construction of three barrages between Yellampally & Medigadda. Its objective is to utilize Godavari water for drinking and irrigation. The Barrage/Project site is located at Medigadda Village, Mahadevpur Mandal, Jayashankar Bhupalpally district in Telangana State, India.

Proposed Barrage Details:

Project info
A memorandum of understanding was signed by states of Maharashtra and Telangana, as part of which, Chanaka-Korata Barrage on Painganga River, Tummidihatti Barrage on Pranhita River and Lakshmi Barrage on Godavari River will be constructed.

Medigadda Barrage foundation was laid by First Chief Minister of Telangana, K.Chandrashekar Rao on 2 May 2016.

See also
 Sriram Sagar Project
 Annaram Barrage
 Sundilla Barrage
 Lower Manair Dam
 Mid Manair Dam
 Kaddam Project
 Upper Manair Dam
 SRSP Flood Flow Canal
 Nizam Sagar
 Pranahita Chevella
 Alisagar lift irrigation scheme
 Sri Komaram Bheem Project
 Devadula lift irrigation scheme
 Icchampally Project

References

Dams on the Godavari River
Dams in Telangana
Irrigation in Telangana
Adilabad district
Karimnagar district
Godavari basin